Cyprian Gualbert Heinrich Graf von Kreutz (10 July 1777 - ) was a general of the Russian Imperial Army known for his service in the Napoleonic Wars and the November Uprising.

Kreutz was born in Rechytsa, Minsk Voivodeship to the Baltic German branch of the Prussian noble . He began his military career in Poland in the service of King Stanisław August Poniatowski, with the rank of adjutant-general. In 1801 he served as colonel in the regiment of Valerian Zubov. Between 1805 and 1807 he took part in thirteen battles.

He participated in the campaign of 1812, fighting at Ostrovno, Klyastitsy, Smolensk, Tarutino, Maloyaroslavets, and Vyazma. On 15 June he was promoted to major general. On 30 June he commanded troops at Ashmyany. At the Battle of Borodino he was wounded in action. He led numerous campaigns in the following two years, and in 1814 was appointed governor general of the Duchy of Schleswig.

On 11 December 1824 he was made lieutenant general, and participated in the Russo-Turkish War, in the Principality of Moldavia and in Bulgaria. After these campaigns he retired from active service.

He came out of retirement during the November Uprising of 1830, and contributed to the Polish defeat on the southeastern front. In August 1831 he took part in the capture of Warsaw. In September he was decorated with the Order of Saint George.

Kreutz died at his estate in the Courland Governorate.

Sources 

 Словарь русских генералов
 Крейц: портрет и послужной список
  (de)

References 

Russian generals
1777 births
1850 deaths
Russian people of Swedish descent